Guy of Ibelin (Fr: Guy d'Ibelin) (died 29 March 1367) was the dominican bishop of Limassol, Cyprus from 27 April 1357 until his death. He belonged to the noble Cypriot house of Ibelin, closely linked by intermarriage with the kings of Cyprus. His father Balian of Ibelin (d. 28 October 1333), Lord of Arsuf, was a direct descendant of the first Balian of Ibelin, an important crusader. His mother, Margaret of Ibelin, continued to hold the title Lady of Arsuf after her husband's death. In the second half of the fourteenth century the fortunes of the house of Ibelin were in decline, as the once-powerful family became extinct. Guy's brother Philip became the last Ibelin to hold the title Lord of Arsuf. He was executed in Genoa in late 1373 for taking part in the assassination of King Peter I of Cyprus in 1369; King James I of Cyprus subsequently bestowed the title on John of Neviles, viscount of Nicosia, in 1389.

Instead of receiving a prebend, the normal path for a younger son of a high aristocratic family to join the church and enjoy the comfortable life of an ecclesiastical nobleman, Guy chose to join the austere dominican order, perhaps in the same monastery in Nicosia where he was later laid to rest. Two years after his elevation to bishop in 1357, he was the presiding bishop at the coronation of Peter I in the cathedral of St Sophia, Nicosia. It appears that he took part in the campaign to capture Alexandria in 1365, before succumbing to illness in his mansion in Nicosia in 1367.

Guy bequeathed 20,000 bezants towards the construction of the cathedral of St Nicholas in Limassol. A detailed inventory of his belongings survives him; although his main residence, in addition to his three rural estates, was not furnished in an opulent manner, – Turkish carpets and cushions typical of the Latin orient replacing courtly tapestries – he still indulged in hunting, the favourite pastime of the nobility, having three falconers in his service, a modest number for the time.

Notes

References

14th-century births
1367 deaths
Guy
Christians of the Crusades
14th-century Roman Catholic bishops in Cyprus
Members of the Dominican Order
Dominican bishops